Objlog was a frame-based language combining objects and Prolog II from CNRS, Marseille, France.

References 

 "The Inheritance Processes in Prolog", C. Chouraki et al., GRTC/187bis/Mars 1987 (CNRS)
 

Prolog programming language family